The 2023 Arkansas State Red Wolves football team respresented the Arkansas State University as a member of the Sun Belt Conference during the 2023 NCAA Division I FBS football season. They were be led by head coach Butch Jones, in his third season coaching the team. The Red Wolves played their home games at Centennial Bank Stadium in Jonesboro, Arkansas.

Previous season

The Red Wolves finished the 2022 season 3–9, 1–7 in Sun Belt play to finish in last place in the West Division.

Schedule
The football schedule was announced February 24, 2023.

References 

Arkansas State
Arkansas State Red Wolves football seasons
Arkansas State Red Wolves football